Chaotic rotation involves the irregular and unpredictable rotation of an astronomical body. Unlike Earth's rotation, a chaotic rotation may not have a fixed axis or period. Because of the conservation of angular momentum, chaotic rotation is not seen in objects that are spherically symmetric or well isolated from gravitational interaction, but is the result of the interactions within a system of orbiting bodies, similar to those associated with orbital resonance.

Examples of chaotic rotation include Hyperion, a moon of Saturn, which rotates so unpredictably that the Cassini probe could not be reliably scheduled to pass by unexplored regions, and Pluto's Nix, Hydra, and possibly Styx and Kerberos, and also Neptune's Nereid. According to Mark R. Showalter, author of a recent study, "Nix can flip its entire pole. It could actually be possible to spend a day on Nix in which the sun rises in the east and sets in the north. It is almost random-looking in the way it rotates." Another example is that of galaxies; from careful observation by the Keck and Hubble telescopes of hundreds of galaxies, a trend was discovered that suggests galaxies such as our own Milky Way used to have a very chaotic rotation, with planetary bodies and stars rotating randomly. New evidence suggests that our galaxy and other have settled into an orderly, disk-like rotation over the past 8 billion years and that other galaxies are slowly following suit over time.

See also 
 List of orbits

References 

Astrophysics
Rotation in three dimensions
Chaotic maps